Richard "Dick" Hutcherson (November 30, 1931 – November 6, 2005) was an American businessman and a former stock car racer. A native of Keokuk, Iowa, Hutcherson drove in NASCAR competition from 1964 to 1967. He won 14 races, finishing runner-up in his first full season in 1965 and third in 1967, but after four years of top-level racing he retired at the season's end to devote his energies to Hutcherson-Pagan Enterprises, a chassis-building business in Charlotte, North Carolina. His younger brother Ron also became a stock car racer.

IMCA
Dick hailed from Keokuk, Iowa, which has long been called the "Home of Champions" and the "Racing Capital of the World". He was nicknamed The "Keokuk Comet". The “Keokuk Gang” consisted of “Old Man” Ernie Derr, Don White, Ramo Stott and Hutcherson himself. Dick Hutcherson said of Derr: "Got to beat the old man. The old man will be tough to beat if you have to haul him out in a wheelchair." He started racing in 1956 and moved up to the International Motor Contest Association (IMCA) circuit in 1959. Hutch was a quick learner and very competitive and took the IMCA championship in 1963 and 1964. He was the Late Model champion at Huron, South Dakota’s Dakota State Fair Speedway in 1960 and 1964. He has 81 IMCA wins to his credit. During this time he also raced in the Midwest Association for Race Cars circuit.

In the spring of 1962, Curtis Turner fielded a race at Virginia International Raceway in an attempt to compete head to head with NASCAR. The American Road 250 was held on April 1, in direct competition with the regular event at Richmond the same day. Most of the NASCAR regulars chose to compete at Richmond, some because they were afraid to incur the wrath of Bill France. Entries in Turner’s race included two-time NASCAR champion Tim Flock, three time NASCAR Convertible Division Champion Bob Welborn, and Hutcherson. Hutcherson made an impression by finishing third behind Turner and Welborn.

NASCAR career
While racing in the Midwest, Hutcherson kept hearing about the great racing and the big purses in NASCAR, so he moved south and started on the Grand National circuit. On March 28, 1964 at the Greenville-Pickens Speedway in South Carolina, the former IMCA champion was a surprise entry and put his Ford on the pole for his debut race. He led the first 60 laps before being overtaken; failure of lug bolts on his right front wheel forced him to the pits after his 109th lap.

He won 14 NASCAR races in 103 starts in the #29 Holman Moody car from 1965 to 1967. Holman Moody dominated the 1965 season and Dick was the hands-down favorite to win rookie of the year, but was ruled ineligible because he was a past champion in IMCA. Hutch took nine victories that season, including the impressive feat of winning the pole position in back-to-back events at Myrtle Beach (which he won) and Valdosta. He nearly won the NASCAR championship in his first full season, settling for second behind Ned Jarrett.

In 1966, Ford briefly withdrew from official factory participation in NASCAR. Contracted to race for Ford, Hutcherson was assigned to the team of drivers in the World Sportscar championship as part of Ford’s challenge to the dominance of Ferrari. Hutcherson and Ronnie Bucknum co-drove the third place #5 GT-40 Mark IIA at the 24 Hours of Le Mans, completing a three-car photo finish orchestrated by Ford executives to increase world-wide photo publication of the achievement. Despite only competing in 14 NASCAR Grand National races that season, he took three wins as part of Ford's factory team run by Holman Moody.

In 1967 Dick Hutcherson made 33 starts with two wins, 22 top 5s, and ranked third overall in points. He won the Smoky Mountain 200 at Maryville on July 27 and the Dixie 500 at Atlanta on August 6, the latter coming after Richard Petty blew an engine while leading and immediately preceding Petty's streak of 10 straight wins. A string of top 5 finishes toward the end of the season, including leading late in the race at Rockingham only to succumb to engine problems, solidified third in the points despite running only 33 times compared to Petty's 48 and James Hylton's 46. Dick averaged 1,020 points per race as compared to Petty's 885 points and Hylton's 792. Hutcherson retired at the end of the season.

After retirement
With 22 poles and 14 wins between 1964 and 1968, Hutch retired from full-schedule racing to concentrate on his chassis-building business in Charlotte, NC. After four years of top-level racing he became crew chief for his friend and fellow driver David Pearson in 1968. The combination won the championship in 1968 and 1969. In 1968 he also appeared in the Elvis Presley stock car racing movie Speedway.

Another step in his career became a reality after his tenure with Pearson when he was named general manager of Holman-Moody, a position he held until December 1971 when he and West Coast driver Eddie Pagan formed Hutcherson-Pagan, a business to build and repair race cars. The two were very successful as they built cars for A. J. Foyt, Darrell Waltrip, Rick Wilson, and others.

Recalling his involvement with Foyt, Hutcherson said that "A.J. had bought a Camaro to run USAC stock cars and we were running at Texas World Speedway at College Station. He had gotten mad about what some reporters had written about him in the days before the race. Well he sat on the pole and was leading the race when he pulled in with just a couple laps to go. I leaned in the car and asked him what was wrong and he said, 'Overheating.' I looked at the gauges which were normal and said, 'Why'd you pull out?' He looked at me and said, 'I didn't want to talk to those reporters in Victory Circle.' We had the race won and he parked the damn car!"

In 1976, Hutcherson un-retired to drive at the 24 Hours of Le Mans again. He co-drove a 7-liter Ford Torino with Dick Brooks and Marcel Migiot. The Torino retired in the 11th hour with an oil leak.

Hutcherson become sole owner of the firm after the death of Eddie Pagan in 1984. One of the sport’s most successful car building operations over the last 30 years, Hutcherson-Pagan parts trucks are still a familiar site around the nation’s race tracks. After being a former owner, President, and one of the founders of Hutcherson-Pagan, Dick retired. He died on November 6, 2005 on his way home from Florida.

Motorsports career results

NASCAR
(key) (Bold – Pole position awarded by qualifying time. Italics – Pole position earned by points standings or practice time. * – Most laps led.)

Grand National Series

Daytona 500 results

24 Hours of Le Mans results

References

 Circle Track magazine, August 1993

External links
Hutcherson Racing
 
Hutch-pagan.com
Hutcherson's win list

1931 births
2005 deaths
NASCAR drivers
People from Keokuk, Iowa
24 Hours of Le Mans drivers
Racing drivers from Iowa
World Sportscar Championship drivers